Philip M. Jefferies (May 31, 1925 – April 6, 1987)  was an American set decorator. He was active from the mid-1950s through the mid-1980s. He was nominated for an Academy Award in the category Best Art Direction for the 1973 film Tom Sawyer.

Filmography

References

External links

American set decorators
1925 births
1987 deaths
People from Pennsylvania
American art directors
American production designers